"All For Me Grog" is a traditional folk song, also known as Good Brown Ale and Tobacco, that was originally popular with sailors and later adopted by folk music performers and pub singers. (Roud 475). It was collected by George Gardiner (folk-song collector) in 1906 under the title "The Nobby Hat" 
. James Madison Carpenter collected a version in c 1928 as "All for the Grog". In 1961 A. L. Lloyd and Alf Edwards recorded the song on an E.P. by Topic Records.

It tells the tale of a man who sells all his possessions, and even his wife, to pay for drink and tobacco. Although the song is effectively about a man's ruin through drink, it is upbeat and celebratory rather than regretful, with the intention to go back to the sea to find a new fortune. It is usually performed as a raucous chorus song. Grog originally referred to a daily ration of rum that used to be given in diluted form to sailors in the Royal Navy. It later came to refer to all types of drink.

There is an Australian version of the song called Across the Western Plains.

The song was recorded as a single by The Dubliners which charted at No.10 in Ireland in July 1967. It had previously been recorded by The Watersons on their eponymous 1966 album and, more recently, by The Mary Wallopers on their eponymous 2022 album.

Serbian band Orthodox Celts recorded a version of the songs for their 1994 self-titled début album.

Charts

References

Year of song unknown
The Dubliners songs
1967 singles
Major Minor Records singles
Songwriter unknown